Richard Duke (1658–1711) was an English poet.

Richard Duke may also refer to:

 Richard Duke (basketball) (born 1948), Australian Olympic basketball player
 Richard Duke (English lawyer) (c. 1515–1572), Member of Parliament for Weymouth
 Richard Duke (violin maker) (1718–1783), English violin maker
 Richard Duke (1652–1733), landowner and Member of Parliament for Ashburton
 Richard Thomas Walker Duke (1822–1898), Virginia congressman and lawyer

See also
 Richard, Duke of York (disambiguation)